These are the results from the synchronised swimming competition at the 2003 World Aquatics Championships.

Medal summary

References
Sports123

 
2003 in synchronized swimming
Synchronised swimming
Synchronised swimming at the World Aquatics Championships